Chicho is a Spanish male nickname. It can be a pet name for many different Spanish names, including Francisco and Narciso.

Notable people known by this nickname include:
 Cándido Sibilio
 Chicho Frumboli, also known as Mariano Frúmboli, Argentinian tango dancer
 Chicho Jesurun, Antillian baseball player
 Chicho Ibáñez, Cuban trovador
 Chicho Sánchez Ferlosio, Spanish singer-songwriter
 Chicho Serna, Colombian football player
 Narcís Pèlach, Spanish football player and coach

Spanish-language hypocorisms